Red Melon Records is a San Francisco-based record label formed in 1998 by Dan Hruby and Jay Zimmermann. This independent label releases electronica music, usually within the house music genre. The majority of the label's output is on 12" single format due to a large fanbase among nightclub disc jockeys. However, in recent years they have released several compilation albums on CD. They have also embraced MP3 as a commercial format, and have distributed a series of compilations, entitled Red Melon Export, on services such as iTunes. Red Melon's last release was in 2004.

References

See also 
 List of record labels
 List of electronic music record labels

Record labels established in 1998
American independent record labels
Electronic music record labels